All rights reversed is a phrase that indicates a release of copyright or a copyleft licensing status. It is a pun on the common copyright disclaimer "All rights reserved", a copyright formality originally required by the Buenos Aires Convention of 1910. "All Rights Reversed" (sometimes spelled rites) was used by author Gregory Hill to authorize the free reprinting of his Principia Discordia in the late 1960s. Hill's disclaimer was accompanied by the kosher "Ⓚ" (for kallisti) symbol, a play on ©, the copyright symbol.

In 1984–5 programmer Don Hopkins sent Richard Stallman a letter labeled "Copyleft—all rights reversed". Stallman chose the phrase to identify his free software method of distribution. It is often accompanied by a reversed version of the copyright symbol (see illustration). That said, this usage is considered legally risky by the Free Software Foundation.

"All Rights Reversed", its homophone, "All Rites Reversed", and/or the "Copyleft" symbol, are occasionally used among those who publish or produce media (or any other material that might normally be copyrighted) as a clever means of saying "This is not copyrighted. Please, do with it what you will." and encouraging the duplication and use of the "copy-lefted"  material thereof.

References

Copyleft
Discordianism
English phrases